Michael Liedtke (born January 15, 1992) is an American football offensive guard who is a free agent. He played college football at Illinois State and signed as an undrafted free agent with the Miami Dolphins in 2015. He has also been a member of several other NFL teams.

Professional career

Miami Dolphins
Liedtke signed with the Miami Dolphins as an undrafted free agent on May 8, 2015. He was waived on September 5, 2015 and was later signed to the practice squad on September 28, 2015. He was released on October 6, 2015.

Kansas City Chiefs
On October 13, 2015, Liedtke was signed to the Kansas City Chiefs' practice squad. He signed a reserve/future contract with the Chiefs on January 18, 2016. He was waived on May 9, 2016.

New York Jets
On June 3, 2016, Liedtke was signed by the New York Jets. He was waived on September 3, 2016.

Cleveland Browns
On October 5, 2016, Liedtke was signed to the Cleveland Browns' practice squad. He was released on October 26, 2016.

Tampa Bay Buccaneers
On November 22, 2016, Liedtke was signed to the Tampa Bay Buccaneers' practice squad. He signed a reserve/future contract with the Buccaneers on January 2, 2017.

On September 2, 2017, Liedtke was waived by the Buccaneers and was signed to the practice squad the next day. He was promoted to the active roster on December 2, 2017. He was waived/injured on August 7, and was placed on injured reserve after clearing waivers on August 8. Liedtke did not receive an exclusive-rights free agent tender from the Buccaneers after the 2019 season and became a free agent.

Washington Football Team
Liedtke signed a one-year contract with the Washington Football Team on May 9, 2020. He was placed on injured reserve on September 5, 2020, before being waived on November 17, 2020.

References

External links
 Illinois State Redbirds bio

1992 births
Living people
American football offensive linemen
Cleveland Browns players
Illinois State Redbirds football players
Kansas City Chiefs players
Miami Dolphins players
New York Jets players
People from Woodstock, Illinois
Players of American football from Illinois
Sportspeople from the Chicago metropolitan area
Tampa Bay Buccaneers players
Washington Redskins players
Washington Football Team players